Eva Andersson (born 3 June 1970) is a Swedish female curler.

Teams

References

External links
 

Living people
1970 births
Swedish female curlers
Swedish curling champions
20th-century Swedish women